Teguh Setyabudi is an Indonesian civil servant who was acting governor of Southeast Sulawesi province in 2018. Setyabudi was appointed by Home Affairs Minister Tjahjo Kumolo to replace Saleh Lasata on 18 February 2018. Lasata himself had been appointed by Kumolo as acting governor to replace Nur Alam, who'd been removed from office due to a graft investigation by the Corruption Eradication Commission. Lasata praised Setyabudi's inauguration as an honor for the people.

Setyabudi has also served as the Home Ministry's head of the Agency for Human Resources Development, as well as the head of the Directorate General of Regional Autonomy.

References

Governors of Southeast Sulawesi
Living people
Year of birth missing (living people)